Stephanie Nogueras (born November 18, 1989) is an American actress. She is known for her roles in the television series Switched at Birth, Grimm, and Killing It, as well as the 2018 film Unfriended: Dark Web.

Life and career
Nogueras was born "profoundly deaf". She is Puerto Rican from New Jersey originally, and was raised in a hearing family. Holding a Bachelor of Liberal Arts and Sciences degree from Rochester Institute of Technology, she has mentored people in deaf culture and American Sign Language.

From 2013 through 2017, she portrayed Natalie Pierce on ABC Family's Switched at Birth. In 2018, she starred as Amaya, the lead protagonist's girlfriend, in the horror film Unfriended: Dark Web. Nogueras currently portrays Camille on the TV series Killing It, the ex-wife of the main character and mother to their daughter.

In 2023 she starred in episode 2 of the Fox crime anthology Accused. Max Gao of Yahoo Entertainment called her performance "stunning".

She married her husband in June 2022. In July 2022, Nogueras announced she's pregnant with a girl, due December.

Filmography

References

External links
 
 

21st-century American actresses
American television actresses
American deaf actresses
Living people
Puerto Rican actresses
1989 births